A list of articles related to Christian views of Jesus:

Jesus
Christian views of Jesus
Cultural and historical background of Jesus
Dramatic portrayals of Jesus Christ
Gospel harmony
Historical Jesus
Historicity of Jesus
Images of Jesus
Jesus and John the Baptist
Jesus Christ Superstar
Jesus in the Christian Bible 
Jesus Movement
Jesus myth theory
Jesus of Nazareth
Jesus-Only doctrine
Nazareth
The Passion of the Christ
Visions of Jesus and Mary

Christian
Christian cross
Christian Identity
Christian view of marriage
Christianity
Christianity and Biblical prophecy
Christianity and Islam
Christianity and Judaism
Christians
Christological argument
History of Christianity
Jesus Prayer
Judeo-Christian
Persecution of Christians

Hebrew
Aramaic language
Near sacrifice of Isaac
Jewish Messiah
Jews for Jesus
Jews in the New Testament
Torah

General
Active obedience of Christ
Advocate
AD
Anoint
Antichrist
Apostle
Ascension
Baptism
BC
Blessed Sacrament
Blood
Blood Atonement
Christus Dominus
Crucifixion
Deicide
God
God and gender
Immanuel
INRI
Isa
Lamb of God
The Last Supper
Logos
Nativity of Jesus
Nativity scene
Nazarene
Passion
Redeemer
Sacred Heart
Sermon on the Mount
Session of Christ
Son of God
Stations of the Cross

People
Bishop Henry
Emicho
Billy Graham
Hippolytus of Rome
John the Baptist
Jude
Leviticus
Madonna
Mary Magdalene
Mary, sister of Lazarus
Philipp Melanchthon
Monk
Nun
Peter the Hermit
Pharisee
Pontius Pilate
Pope
Priest
Simeon
Three Wise Men
Laurentius Valla
Zacheus the Tax Collector

Things
Aloes
Altar
Cross
Crucifix
Decalogue
The Golden Bough
Good Friday
Halo
Holy Grail
Holy Prepuce
Holy Spirit
Hot cross bun
Icon
Julian calendar
Lord's Prayer
Massacre of the Innocents
Medieval art
Medieval poetry
Morning Star
Paschal candle
Passe-dix
Passion flower
Passion play
Pietà
Prayer
Q document
Relic
Religious festival
Religious law
The Robe
Sacrament
Sacred language
"Silent Night"
Spear of Destiny
Ten Commandments
Tomb
True Cross
Veil

Places
Basilica of the Sacré Coeur
Capernaum
Church of the Nativity
Corcovado (Brazil)
Emmaus
Mount of Olives
Nazareth
Notre-Dame de Reims
Rio de Janeiro
Sea of Galilee
Turin

Concepts
Adoptionism
The Antichrist and the last days
Apocrypha
Arguments for the existence of God
Biblical Jesus
Born again
Children of Israel
Chosen people
Clerical celibacy
Covenant
Creed
Damnation
Dispensationalism
Eschatology
Enlightenment
Eucharist
Evangelicalism
Extra Ecclesiam Nulla Salus
First Vision
The Four Spiritual Laws
Fundamentalism
Gnosticism
Grace
Heresy
Iconoclasm
Idolatry
Impeccability
Incarnation
Jehovah's Witnesses beliefs
Kingdom of Heaven
Laying on of hands
Life-death-rebirth deity
Lord
Mannerism
Marcionism
Messiah
Millennialism
Monoenergism
Names of God
The nature of God
Nestorianism
Original sin
Parable
Peace symbol
Pentecostalism
Perseverance of the saints
Predestination
Prophet
Rapture
Religion
Religious conversion
Religious pluralism
Repentance
Resurrection of the dead
Resurrection
Revelation
Righteousness
Sabbath
Salvation
Season of advent
Second Coming
Semiotic literary interpretation
Sin
Sin-offering
Slogan 'Jesus is Lord'
Solemnity
Soul
Spiritual warfare
Supernatural
Theology
Throne
Transfiguration of Jesus
Transubstantiation
Trinity
What would Jesus do?

Writings
Acts of Pilate
Alexamenos graffito
Bible
The Bible and history
Bible story
Book of Mormon
Dating the Bible
Epistle of Jude
Epistle to the Colossians
Epistle to the Ephesians
Epistle to the Romans
Gospel
Gospel Harmony
Gospel of John
Gospel of Luke
Gospel of Matthew
Gospel of Mark
Gospel of Peter
Names for books of Judeo-Christian scripture
Old Testament
Revised Standard Version
The Suffering Servant

Religious orders
Abrahamic religion
Adventist
Anabaptist
Baptist
Baptist General Convention of Texas
Family International 
Confessing Church
Council of Chalcedon
Eastern Orthodox
First Council of Nicaea
Fundamentalist Christianity
Holy Orders
Holiness movement
Jehovah's Witnesses
Jesus Army
Knights Hospitaller
Midwest Christian Outreach
National Baptist Convention, USA, Inc.
Native American Church
Oriental Orthodox
Presbyterian Church in America
Promise Keepers
Rastafari movement
Reformed Presbyterian Church of North America
Religious Society of Friends
Roman Catholic Church
Samaritan's Purse
Seventh-day Adventist Church
Society of Jesus

Other
Abhidhamma
And did those feet in ancient time
Behistun Inscription
The Chronicles of Narnia''The Last Supper (Leonardo)The Lesser Key of SolomonThe Lion, the Witch and the Wardrobe''
The Magician (Tarot card)
A Plea for Captain John Brown
Superman

Lists
List of Bible stories
List of Biblical figures
List of Biblical names
List of famous suicides
List of Latin phrases
List of political entities named after people
List of religious topics

Jesus-related topics
Jesus-related topics
Jesus
Jesus